Veli Rat  is a village in Croatia on the island of Dugi Otok, it has a population of around 300 people. It is connected to other villages on the island by the D109 highway. The Village Veli Rat mainly has a population increase during the summer because of the tourists. To the northwest of the village is the Veli Rat lighthouse.

References

Populated places in Zadar County
Dugi Otok